Combefa is a commune in the Tarn department in southern France.

It has an old ruined castle, the "Château de Combefa", former summer residence of the bishops of Albi. The chapel of the castle contained a 15th-century sculpture group representing the Entombment of Christ. The sculpture group was moved to the hospital of Monestiés in 1774.

See also
Communes of the Tarn department

References

Communes of Tarn (department)